Lobster Records is an independent record label based in Santa Barbara, California.  It was founded by Stevan Lubarsky in 1991. The label started with Bad Neighbor, a Montecito-based rock band, with a huge local following featuring Alan Duncan and Mark Bennett on guitars, Sean Murphy on drums, Todd Roll on Bass and Zak Remington on lead vocals. Former members include Lynn Strait on bass and Bobby Champagne on drums. Steve went on to develop Buck Wild, featuring Lagwagon guitarist Shawn Dewey, and has since released records from marquee pop-punk acts such as Yellowcard and Over It.

They have also started a new label title Oort Records which has signed bands such as Faster Faster and Nottingham.

Signed Acts
Bad Neighbor (Cito)

Current
 Lorene Drive 2005-2009 Currently on hiatus

Former
 Buck Wild
 Days Like These
 First to Leave
 Jargon
 Joystick
 Mock Orange
 Over It
 Park
 A Small Victory
 Staring Back (band)
 Whippersnapper
 Yellowcard

Through Oort
 A Black Market Diary
 Anchors for Arms
 Danny Rocco
 Dawn of the Dude
 Faster Faster
 Hands
 Rosematter
 TGL
 That Was Something
 Nottingham

Release history
 001 - Various Artists - "Greetings"
 003 - Buck Wild - "Beat Me Silly"
 005 - Joystick - "Heavy Chevy"
 006 - Whippersnapper - "America's Favorite Pastime"
 007 - Jargon - "Jargon" LP
 008 - Mock Orange - "Nines & Sixes" LP
 009 - Buck Wild - "Full Metal Overdrive"
 010 - Staring Back - "The Mean Streets of Goleta"
 011 - Whippersnapper - "The Long Walk"
 012 - Staring Back - "Many Will Play"
 014 - Mock Orange - "The Record Play" LP
 015 - Yellowcard - "One for the Kids"
 016 - Park - "No Signal" LP
 017 - Staring Back - "On" LP
 018 - Over It - "Timing is Everything"
 019 - A Small Victory - "The Pieces We Keep" EP
 020 - Park - "It Won't Snow Where You're Going" LP
 021 - Days Like These - "Charity Burns Green" LP
 022 - A Small Victory - "El Camino" LP
 023 - Over It - "Silverstrand" LP
 024 - Lorene Drive - "Romantic Wealth" LP
 025 - Days Like This "Inventure" LP
 026 - Park - "Building a Better ..." LP

See also
 List of record labels

References

External links
 Official site

American independent record labels
Record labels established in 1996
Punk record labels
Alternative rock record labels
Companies based in Santa Barbara County, California